Kanhaya Lal Pokhriyal is an Indian Police official and mountaineer, known for climbing the highest peak in the world, Mount Everest, in 1992. He was born on 10 January 1949 at the small village of Sachkhil in the Pauri Garhwal district of the Indian state of Uttarakhand and has served the Indo-Tibetan Border Police. He is the only Indian mountaineer to have climbed Mount Kanchenjunga through two routes, from Sikkim and Nepal.

Awards
 Received Padma Shri award by The Government of India in 2003.

See also 
List of 20th century summiters of Mount Everest
Indian summiters of Mount Everest - Year wise
List of Mount Everest summiters by number of times to the summit
List of Mount Everest records of India

References 

Recipients of the Padma Shri in sports
Living people
1949 births
People from Pauri Garhwal district
Mountain climbers from Uttarakhand
Indian police officers
Indian mountain climbers
Indian summiters of Mount Everest